27 world records and  91 Olympic records (exact counts were announced during the closing ceremony) were set in various events at the 2016 Summer Olympics in Rio de Janeiro.

Olympic and world records set by sport

Archery

Athletics

Canoeing

Cycling track

Modern pentathlon

Rowing

Shooting

Swimming

Men

Women

Legend: r – First leg of relay

All world records (WR) are consequently Olympic records (OR).

Weightlifting

Men's

Women's

World records set by date

References

2016 Summer Olympics
2016 Summer Olympics